Palmar veins refers to:

Palmar digital veins, veins found on the fingers
Palmar metacarpal veins, veins found on the palm